Elves Umar Baldé (born 2 October 1999) is a Bissau-Guinean born Portuguese professional footballer who plays for Farense as a winger.

Football career
On 14 August 2016 Elves made his professional debut with Sporting B starting in a 2015–16 Segunda Liga match against Sporting da Covilhã.

On 27 December 2018 it was confirmed, that Baldé would spend the rest of the season on loan at Paços de Ferreira.

On 26 August 2019, he joined Feirense on loan.

Club statistics

References

External links

Stats and profile at LPFP 

1999 births
Living people
Portuguese footballers
Portugal youth international footballers
Bissau-Guinean footballers
Portuguese sportspeople of Bissau-Guinean descent
Bissau-Guinean emigrants to Portugal
Association football midfielders
Liga Portugal 2 players
Primeira Liga players
Sporting CP footballers
F.C. Paços de Ferreira players
C.D. Feirense players
S.C. Farense players